is a railway station in the city of Tagajō, Miyagi Prefecture, Japan, operated by East Japan Railway Company (JR East).

Lines
Kokufu-Tagajō Station is served by the Tōhoku Main Line, and is located 363.5 rail kilometers from the official starting point of the line at Tokyo Station. Trains of the Senseki-Tohoku Line also stop at the station.

Station layout
The station has two side platforms with an elevated station building cantilevered over the tracks. The station has a Midori no Madoguchi staffed ticket office.

Platforms

History
Kokufu-Tagajō Station opened on September 29, 2001. The station was absorbed into the JR East network upon the privatization of the Japanese National Railways (JNR) on April 1, 1987.

Passenger statistics
In fiscal 2018, the station was used by an average of 1,085 passengers daily (boarding passengers only).

Surrounding area
 Taga Castle ruins
 Tōhoku History Museum
Tohoku Gakuin University School of Engineering, Tagajō campus

References

External links

 JR East Station information 

Railway stations in Miyagi Prefecture
Tōhoku Main Line
Railway stations in Japan opened in 2001
Tagajō, Miyagi